Wheelchair Tennis events have been contested at every Asian Para Games since 2010 Asian Games in Guangzhou.

Editions

Medalists 
Medal winning teams for every Asian Para Games since 2018 are as follows:

Men's singles

Men's doubles

Women's singles

Women's doubles

Quad singles

Women's doubles

Medal table

References

External links
Asian Paralympic Committee

 
Sports at the Asian Para Games
Wheelchair tennis at multi-sport events